The 2001 Copa Ericsson was a professional tennis tournament played on clay courts. The tournament was part of the 2001 ATP Challenger Series. It took place at the Club de Polo y Equitación San Cristóbal in Santiago, Chile between 29 October and 4 November 2001.

The most notable event in this edition is the participation of former No. 1 Marcelo Ríos in the tournament, after a 5-year absence from the ATP Challenger Series tournaments. Ríos would also try to end his curse of not obtaining a title at his home country, after being runner-up at the Chile Open 3 times in 1995, 1996 and 1997.

Singles main-draw entrants

Seeds

 1 Rankings are as of 22 October 2001.

Other entrants
The following players received wildcards into the singles main draw:
  Jorge Aguilar
  Hermes Gamonal
  Adrián García
  Marcelo Ríos

The following players received entry from the qualifying draw:
  Diego Moyano
  Sebastián Prieto
  Sergio Roitman
  Dušan Vemić

The following players received entry as lucky losers into the singles main draw:
  Gastón Etlis
  Didac Pérez

The following players received entry as a Special Exempt into the singles main draw:
  Jan Frode Andersen
  Cristian Kordasz

Doubles main-draw entrants

Seeds 

 Rankings are as of 22 October 2001.

Other entrants 
The following pairs received wildcards into the doubles main draw:
  Hermes Gamonal /  Fernando González
  Miguel Miranda /  Julio Peralta
  Felipe Parada /  Juan Felipe Yáñez

The following pair received entry as alternates into the doubles main draw:
  Ricardo Mello /  Flávio Saretta

Champions

Singles 

  Marcelo Ríos defeated  Edgardo Massa, 6–4, 6–2.

Doubles 

  André Sá /  Alexandre Simoni defeated  Daniel Melo /  Dušan Vemić, 3–6, 6–3, 7–6(7–3)

References

External links
 ITF tournament profile
 Results archive at the ATP website

Tennis tournaments in Chile
2001 in Chilean tennis